Calabar Municipal is a Local Government Area of Cross River State, Nigeria. Its headquarters are in the city of Calabar.
 
It has an area of 142 km and a population of 179,392 at the 2006 census.

The postal code of the area is 540.

Monarch 
The paramount ruler of Calabar Municipality is known as the Ndidem of the Quas and paramount ruler of Calabar municipality, he is the president of traditional rulers council in Calabar municipality and grand patriarch of Ejagham Nation.

Prominent persons from Calabar Municipality 
Senator Joseph Oqua Ansa, is the first person from Calabar Municipal Local Government Area (LGA) to be voted in as a senator representing Cross River State Southern Senatorial District in 1979.

References

Local Government Areas in Cross River State